van den Abeele is a surname of Belgian origin, and may refer to:

 Albert van den Abeele (1907-????), Belgian yacht racer
 Andries Van den Abeele (born 1935), Belgian entrepreneur, politician, historian and historical preservationist
 Michel van den Abeele, Belgian diplomat
 Pieter Van den Abeele, computer programmer

Surnames of Belgian origin
Dutch-language surnames
Surnames of Dutch origin